Fairview Cemetery may refer to:

Canada
 Fairview Cemetery, Halifax, Nova Scotia
 Fairview Cemetery, Niagara Falls

United States
(by state)
 Fairview Cemetery (Van Buren, Arkansas), listed on the NRHP in Arkansas
 Fairview Cemetery, Confederate Section, Van Buren, Arkansas, listed on the NRHP in Arkansas
 Fairview Cemetery (Salida, Colorado)
 Fairview Cemetery (Colorado Springs, Colorado) in El Paso County, Colorado
 Fairview Cemetery (Jasper, Indiana)
 Fairview Cemetery (Council Bluffs, Iowa)
 Fairview Cemetery (Bowling Green, Kentucky)
 Fairview Cemetery (Boston, Massachusetts), listed on the NRHP in Massachusetts
 Fairview Cemetery (Dalton, Massachusetts), listed on the NRHP in Massachusetts
 Fairview Cemetery (Westford, Massachusetts), listed on the NRHP in Massachusetts
 Fairview Cemetery (Stillwater, Minnesota)
 Fairview Cemetery (Gallatin County, Montana) in Gallatin County, Montana
 Fairview Cemetery (Flathead County, Montana) in Flathead County, Montana
 Fairview Cemetery (Broadwater County, Montana) in Broadwater County, Montana
 Fairview Cemetery (Daniels County, Montana) in Daniels County, Montana
 Fairview Cemetery (Lincoln, Nebraska)
 Fairview Cemetery (Fairview, New Jersey)
 Fairview Cemetery (Westfield, New Jersey)
 Fairview Cemetery (Santa Fe, New Mexico), listed on the NRHP in New Mexico
 Fairview Cemetery (Wahpeton, North Dakota)
 Fairview Cemetery (Pen Argyl, Pennsylvania)
 Fairview Cemetery (Bastrop, Texas)
 Fairview Cemetery (Norwich, Vermont)
 Fairview Cemetery (Culpeper, Virginia), listed on the NRHP in Virginia